State Trunk Highway 130 (often called Highway 130, STH-130 or WIS 130) is a state highway in the U.S. state of Wisconsin. It runs in north–south in south central Wisconsin from near Dodgeville to near Hill Point.

Route description
Starting at WIS 23, WIS 130 begins to meander northwestward and then northward, passing through Clyde. Then, it starts running concurrently with WIS 133 immediately before they cross the Wisconsin River. After crossing the river, they then enter Lone Rock. Then, they intersect with US 14/WIS 60. At this point, WIS 133 ends there while WIS 130 turns west along another concurrency. Then, WIS 130 turns north away from the concurrency. It then continues to meander northward, passing through Bear Valley and Sandusky. Then, it intersects WIS 154 north of Sandusky. At this point, the route ends there and the road continues north as part of CTH-G.

History
Beginning in 1923, WIS 130 was designated along half of its present-day route from WIS 23 to WIS 41 (previously and later WIS 11, now US 14)/WIS 60 north of Lone Rock. Up until 1948, no significant changes were made to the routing. In 1948, WIS 130 was extended northward via CTH-J, CTH-N, and CTH-G. In 1949, part of the WIS 130 extension was moved northwestward away from CTH-N and CTH-G.

Major intersections

See also

References

External links

130
Transportation in Iowa County, Wisconsin
Transportation in Richland County, Wisconsin
Transportation in Sauk County, Wisconsin